Lake Krasnoye is a lake in Chukotka Autonomous Okrug, Far Eastern Russia.

It is located near the Anadyr Estuary and is the biggest lake in the Anadyr Lowlands.  Historically, it was referred to on maps as Lake Krasnyano.

See also
Lake Pekulney
List of lakes of Russia

References

K